Westmoreland Hospital, owned by Excela Health, is an acute-care hospital in central Westmoreland County. It offers a range of inpatient and outpatient services, including an interventional heart center.

Westmoreland Hospital rating data
The HealthGrades website contains the latest quality data for Excela Westmoreland Hospital, as of 2015. For this rating section three different types of data from HealthGrades are presented: quality ratings for thirty-three inpatient conditions and procedures, thirteen patient safety indicators, percentage of patients giving the hospital a 9 or 10 (the two highest possible ratings).

For inpatient conditions and procedures, there are three possible ratings: worse than expected, as expected, better than expected.  For this hospital the data for this category is:
Worse than expected - 1
As expected - 30
Better than expected - 2
For patient safety indicators, there are the same three possible ratings. For this hospital safety indicators were rated as:
Worse than expected - 0
As expected -11
Better than expected - 2

Data for patients giving this hospital a 9 or 10 are:
Patients rating this hospital as a 9 or 10 - 68%
Patients rating hospitals as a 9 or 10 nationally - 69%

References

Hospitals in Pennsylvania
Buildings and structures in Westmoreland County, Pennsylvania